The Gubin coal mine is a large mine in the west of Poland in Gubin, Lubusz Voivodeship, 350 km west of the capital, Warsaw. Gubin represents one of the largest coal reserve in Poland having estimated reserves of 282.7 million tonnes of coal. The annual coal production is around 5.5 million tonnes.

References

External links 
 Official site

Coal mines in Poland
Buildings and structures in Lubusz Voivodeship